The 1999 Kremlin Cup was a WTA tennis tournament, played on indoor carpet courts.

Players

Seeds

  Sarah Pitkowski /  Ekaterina Sysoeva (Qualifiers)
  Sylvia Plischke /  Silvija Talaja (qualifying competition)

Qualifiers
  Sarah Pitkowski /  Ekaterina Sysoeva

Qualifying draw

External links
 1999 Kremlin Cup Doubles Qualifying Draw

Kremlin Cup
Kremlin Cup